Hugh Clifford Mackay (born 1938)  is an Australian psychologist, social researcher and writer, who founded the Australian quarterly research series The Mackay Report 1979–2003, which later became The Ipsos Mackay Report. He was a weekly newspaper columnist for 25 years and is a regularly appearing commentator on radio and television.

Career
He is a graduate of Sydney Grammar School, and holds a Bachelor of Arts from the University of Sydney and a Master of Arts from Macquarie University. He was a founding member of The Australian Psychological Society and is one of the founders of The Ethics Centre formerly known as The St James Ethics Centre.

Mackay has held a number of honorary academic positions, including Adjunct Professor in the Faculty of Arts of Charles Sturt University, Professor of Social Science at the University of Wollongong and professorial fellow in the Macquarie Graduate School of Management.

He is a patron of the Asylum Seekers Centre and was previously a member of the Bell Shakespeare Artistic Advisory Panel. He was the inaugural chairman of the ACT Government's Community Inclusion Board, chairman of trustees of Sydney Grammar School and deputy chairman of the Australia Council. He has also served on committees of the Law Society of New South Wales, the Sydney Peace Prize, and the National Heart Foundation of Australia.. After an in air incident on a flight from Sydney to Brisbane Hugh didn’t fly for 15 years despite his busy nationwide work commitments over that time.

Mackay is a Fellow of the Australian Psychological Society and the Royal Society of NSW, and an Associate Fellow of the British Psychological Society.

Honours and awards
He holds honorary doctorates in Letters from Charles Sturt University, Macquarie University, the University of New South Wales the University of Western Sydney and the University of Wollongong as well as the Hartnett Medal from the Royal Society of Arts, and the Alumni Award for Community Service from the University of Sydney.

At the 2015 Australia Day Honours, Mackay was appointed an Officer of the Order of Australia for distinguished service to the community in the areas of social research and psychology, as an author and commentator, and through roles with visual and performing arts and educational organisations.

Publications

Non-fiction

 drew on 60 individual reports
 (subsequently re-published as 'The Good Listener'. 1998)

 (2nd edition published 2019).

 (2nd edition published 2019)
 (originally published 2013)

Periodical
The Mackay Report quarterly research series (subsequently The Ipsos Mackay Report), over 100 reports including:

Fiction

References

External links

 Hugh Mackay, Personal Website

Living people
Australian journalists
20th-century Australian novelists
21st-century Australian novelists
Australian male novelists
Australian psychologists
Officers of the Order of Australia
People educated at Sydney Grammar School
Place of birth missing (living people)
University of Sydney alumni
Macquarie University alumni
1938 births
20th-century Australian male writers
21st-century Australian male writers